Pyroligneous acid, also called wood vinegar or wood acid, is a dark liquid produced by the destructive distillation of wood and other plant materials.

Composition 
The principal components of pyroligneous acid are 10% acetic acid, acetone and methanol. It was once used as a commercial source for acetic acid.

History 
Pyroligneous acid (acetum lignorum) was investigated by German chemist Johann Rudolph Glauber. The acid was used as a substitute for vinegar. It was also used topically for treating wounds, ulcers and other ailments. A salt can be made by neutralizing the acid with a lye made from the ashes of the burnt wood.

During the United States Civil War it became increasingly difficult for the Confederate States of America to obtain much needed salt. Curing meat and fish with pyroligneous acid was attempted by cooks to compensate for this deficiency, but it was insufficient.

In the nineteenth century, pyroligneous acid was used to prepare an impure aluminium sulfacetate mordant for use with cotton, but the resulting mixture imparted a burnt odor to the cotton, and Ganswindt recommended its use be abandoned in favour of purer preparations in 1899.

In 1895, pyroligneous acid was first marketed under the brand Wright's Liquid Smoke, a liquid smoke product intended to impart the flavor and some of the preservative effects of wood smoking to meats and vegetables. In the early 21st century, concerns about the carcinogenic effects of components of wood smoke decreased the production of heavily smoked foods in favor of lighter smoking and liquid smoke for foods.

References

External links 
AcidWorks

Wood
Organic acids
Vinegar